Verkhovyna National Nature Park is a national park of Ukraine that covers the highest reaches of the Cheremosh River, in the Carpathian Mountains.  The park is in the administrative district of Verkhovyna in Ivano-Frankivsk Oblast; the nearest city is Chernivtsi.

Topography
Located in one of the most mountainous, inaccessible parts of the Ukrainian Carpathians, the park is situated in the Chivchino-Grinyava mountain range, at the headwaters of the two main tributaries of the Cheremosh River, which flows north into the Prut River, which in turns flows east and south to the Danube River.  Geologically, the park is on the northwest portion of the Marmaros crystalline massif (limestone). The Cheremosh National Nature Park is to the east.

Climate and ecoregion
The climate of Verkhovyna is Humid continental climate, warm summer (Köppen climate classification (Dfb)).

Flora and fauna
The park has forest, meadow and swamp floristic communities.  Forest types are affected by altitude zoning.  Above 1,600 meters is mostly mountain pine and green alder.  From 1,200 meters to 1,600 meters, the forest is predominantly spruce.  Below 1,200 meters the forests are mixed.

Public use
As a relatively new park, and one which emphasizes nature protection, recreational facilities are still under development.  There are hiking paths and the staff provides educational programs for local schoolchildren.

See also
 National Parks of Ukraine

References

External links

National parks of Ukraine